The Mark H. McCormack Medal is presented annually by The Royal and Ancient Golf Club of St Andrews to the leading player in the World Amateur Golf Ranking after the last 'elite' event of the season. The award is named after World Golf Hall of Famer Mark McCormack, who was a supporter of golf and the founder of IMG.

In 2011, New Zealand's Lydia Ko was awarded the first ever women's Mark H. McCormack Medal, a trophy she retained in 2012 and 2013.

Beginning in 2012, the previous year's men's winner receives an invitation to both the U.S. Open and The Open Championship provided he remains an amateur.

Winners

Men
The medal is awarded to the male player ranked number one in the World Amateur Golf Ranking the week after the U.S. Amateur or the European Amateur whichever finishes last.

Women
The medal is awarded to the female player ranked number one in the World Amateur Golf Ranking the week after the U.S. Women's Amateur, the last elite women's WAGR event of the season.

References

Golf awards
Amateur golf